Bobby Sheng (born April 1972) is an American-Taiwanese businessman, record and film producer, restaurateur, club owner, and president and CEO of Bora Pharmaceuticals. 

Sheng is also a co-founder of MACHI Entertainment .

References

1972 births
Living people
Taiwanese businesspeople